ATN Bangla, 'ATN' being the acronym of the unused Asian Television Network, is a Bangladeshi Bengali-language satellite and cable television channel owned by Multimedia Production Company. It is based in the Kawran Bazar neighborhood of Dhaka. ATN Bangla is the first privately owned television channel and the first to broadcast on satellite in Bangladesh. The channel began broadcasting on 15 July 1997. ATN Bangla is broadcast in over 130 countries worldwide.

History 
As nothing of the kind existed in the country at the time, Mahfuzur Rahman had plans to establish a privately owned satellite television channel in Bangladesh, after seeing the popularity of Zee TV in India. He later rented a one-hour slot to broadcast Bengali-language programs on ATN Music, a Mumbai-based television channel, which gained popularity. After ATN Music was shut down, Rahman thought of establishing a full-fledged Bengali-language satellite television channel.

ATN Bangla was the first Bangladeshi privately owned television channel to officially gain a license to broadcast. It officially began broadcasting using a Thaicom satellite on 15 July 1997, with the "Obiram Banglar Mukh" (অবিরাম বাংলার মুখ) slogan. It is also the first Bengali-language television channel in the world to broadcast worldwide. The name of the channel, ATN Bangla, was also derived from the defunct Indian channel. The channel broadcast commercials from advertisers that could not advertise on Bangladesh Television due to a strict policy on advertising of the network.

ATN Bangla began using digital technology to broadcast, moving away from analog technology, in May 1999. In 2001, the channel began broadcasting to the Bangladeshi diaspora in Europe. ATN Bangla began broadcasting Bengali-language news programming on 16 August 2001. It later began airing English-language news programming on 1 October 2002. Naem Nizam was the first news editor of ATN Bangla. The channel was heavily praised for its coverage of the Iraq War in 2003. It also introduced hourly news bulletins at that period.

In March 2004, ATN Bangla began broadcasting in the Americas. On 22 November 2004, ATN Bangla won the International Children's Day of Broadcasting Award at the 32nd International Emmy Awards for its segment, Amrao Pari (We, too, Can). The documentary was shot and directed by eighteen Bangladeshi teenagers, and was focused on the story of Abul Khaer, a 9-year-old boy who stopped a passenger train from approaching a disjointed rail track, and prevented a train disaster. The channel had also won several more awards for its news and entertainment programming.

In June 2005, ATN Bangla was added to Sky Digital in the United Kingdom and Ireland. It was later removed from the platform in May 2006. ATN Bangla was launched in Canada on 19 October 2005 by Asian Television Network, which later lost the rights of airing programming from the Bangladeshi ATN Bangla. Thus, the Canadian ATN Bangla no longer has any connection with the Bangladeshi channel.

In 2007, Doll's House, the first Bangladeshi soap opera targeted towards a female audience, premiered on ATN Bangla. ATN Bangla began airing The Lost World in 2009. On 7 June 2010, ATN Bangla's sister, ATN News, officially began broadcasting. In November 2011, ATN Bangla, along with three other Bangladeshi television channels, signed an agreement with UNICEF to air children's programming for one minute.

In 2016, the channel was reprimanded by British telecom regulator Ofcom due to violations of domestic product placement regulations (which require placements to be "editorially justified", not place "undue prominence", and have on-air disclosure). ATN Bangla attempted to defend the violations by arguing that its local subsidiary did not directly benefit from the placements (as the brands placed do not operate in Europe), but Ofcom still found the channel liable for violations of its broadcasting code.

In June 2018, Dipankar Dipon's directorial debut film Dhaka Attack had its world premiere on ATN Bangla. In August 2018, in observance of Eid al-Adha, ATN Bangla aired several Hollywood films dubbed in Bengali, including Titanic. In October 2018, ATN Bangla's Crime Patrol was ranked as the most popular television series in Bangladesh according to TRP reports.

ATN Bangla began airing the Turkish drama Cennet'in Gözyaşları, with the title being simplified to as Jannat, on 14 October 2018. The channel also began airing the Chinese drama Feather Flies to the Sky in March 2019. ATN Bangla inaugurated two reality shows, South Asian Dance Competition and Agamir Taroka, on 8 June 2020. On 30 March 2022, Family Crisis Reloaded, the second season of Family Crisis which aired on NTV, premiered on ATN Bangla. ATN Bangla won the Best TV Program (Lifestyle) award at the Bangladesh Media Innovation Awards 2022 held in September 2022.

Programming 

ATN Bangla is a mixed entertainment television channel. Alongside entertainment and news programming, the channel provides educational, sports, cultural programming, and much more. Religious programming, specifically Islamic, was introduced to the network on 8 September 1998.

Audience share 
ATN Bangla is one of the leading privately owned television channels in Bangladesh. In 2010, the channel held a total audience share of 36%, tied with Channel i, thus both being the highest. In urban areas, ATN Bangla had an audience share of 61%, and in metropolitan areas, it had a share of 57%. In May 2014, ATN Bangla won the best television channel award in an audience survey organized by the Bangladesh Cable TV Viewers Forum. In the United Kingdom, ATN Bangla was the most watched Asian television channel with an audience share of 0.23% and 0.19% in February and March 2021 respectively.

See also
 List of television stations in Bangladesh

References

External links
 
 ATN Bangla on Facebook
 ATN Bangla UK

Television channels and stations established in 1997
Television channels in Bangladesh
1997 establishments in Bangladesh
Mass media in Dhaka